Greenough may refer to:

 Greenough (surname), people with the surname Greenough
 Greenough, Western Australia, a historic town
 Greenough, an unincorporated community in Missoula County, Montana, U.S.
 Greenough Lake, a lake in Montana
 Greenough River, a river in Western Australia
 Shire of Greenough, a former local government area in Western Australia
 Electoral district of Greenough, a former electorate of the Western Australian Legislative Assembly